Myrica rubra, also called yangmei (Cantonese: yeung4 mui4;),  Chinese bayberry, red bayberry, yumberry, waxberry, or Chinese strawberry (and often mistranslated from Chinese as arbutus) is a subtropical tree grown for its fruit.

Description
Leaves are alternately arranged on the branches are divided into petiole and leaf blade. The leaf underside is pale green and sparsely to moderately golden glandular, the top surface is dark green.

The species is dioecious. Male flowers with simple or unobtrusively branched bracts, are held in inflorescences individually or occasionally in groups of a few inflorescences in the leaf axils. The male flowers are accompanied by two to four egg-shaped, sparse lanceolate leaves. Each male flower contains four to six stamens with dark red, elliptical anthers.

Female inflorescences are single with multi-flowered spikes of in length standing in the leaf axils. The rhachis is hairy and glandular. The cover sheets overlap, are hairless and only unobtrusively glandular. Female flowers are accompanied by four leaves. The upper ovary is velvety hairy, with a stylus with a two-lobed scar. There are two slender scar lobes that are colored bright red.

The flowering period extends from March to April in China, with fruits developing from May to June. The fruit is spherical, typically  in diameter, with diameters up to 3 centimeters, a knobby surface. The surface is a thick-skinned, typically a crimson red, but may vary from white to purple, with similar or somewhat lighter flesh color.  At the center is a single seed, with a diameter about half that of the whole fruit. The flesh is sweet and very tart.

Taxonomy
The plant was first described by João de Loureiro in Flora Cochinchinensis, 2, page 548 in 1790 under the name (basionym) Morella rubra  The species was moved to the genus Myrica as Myrica rubra . by Philipp Franz von Siebold and Joseph Gerhard von Zuccarini in treatises of the Bavarian Academy of Sciences. Mathematical and natural science class, volume 4, number 3, page 230 published.

In studies of germplasm, it was clearly distinguished from wax myrtle, and could be subdivided into two groups unrelated to the sex of the plant, but more so by the geographic region in China where the accession originated. Among regions in China, accessions varied within regions, indicating extensive gene mixing. Nearly 100 cultivars of M. rubra exist in China alone. Zhejiang Province is a possible center of diversity for the plant in China.

Chromosome count is  2n = 16

Distribution and habitat 
Seeds are dispersed by Japanese macaques. and Yakushima macaque

Cultivation

Chinese cultivation is concentrated south of the Yangtze River, where it has considerable economic importance and  has been grown for at least 2000 years.

It tolerates poor acidic soils.

Myrica rubra was first introduced into the United States by Frank Nicholas Meyer from seed purchased from the Yokohama Nursery Co. in Japan and published in the Bulletin of Foreign Plant Introductions in 1918. Plants from the collection were grown and fruited in Chico, California and in Brooksville, Florida by David Fairchild. M. rubra is being commercialized in California by Calmei, a California corporation. As of 2007, 865,000 acres were devoted to yangmei production in Chinadouble the amount of acres utilized in apple production in the United States.

The tree is used as ornaments for parks and streets. It is also a traditional tree used in composing classical East Asian gardens.

Products
Besides fresh consumption, the fruits may be dried, canned, soaked in baijiu (Chinese liquor), or fermented into alcoholic beverages, such as wine, beer, or cocktails. Dried fruits are often prepared in the manner of dry huamei (Prunus mume with flavorings such as licorice or salty licorice). The juice has been commercialised under the brand name "Yumberry" under which name it is trademarked in the EU. In Yunnan Province in China, there are two main types of yangmei, a sour type used for making dried fruit and a sweet type used for juice and fresh eating.

In the Philippines, they are dried and preserved in brine and vinegar and made into champóy, the local version of the Chinese huamei.

Other uses include
 bottled pasteurized juice or juice blends
 dye prepared from the bark
 yogurt flavoring
 blended jam and preserves

Research and phytochemicals
Various species of Myrica have been studied scientifically for horticultural characteristics or phytochemicals implicated with health benefits. Dating to 1951, the horticultural literature  includes studies on
 nitrogen-fixing ability of the root nodules system
 presence of Frankia bacteria having nitrogen-fixing properties in root nodules
 microbial characteristics of the subcanopy soil
 niche characteristics in the forest environment
 growth of pollen tubes

Cultural significance
Archaeological and written evidence suggest that yangmei cultivation first took place in China over 2,000 years ago during the Han Dynasty. Yangmei is mentioned throughout Chinese literature, including several appearances in Li Bai's poems.

In Japan, it is the prefectural flower of Kōchi and the prefectural tree of Tokushima. The plant's name appears in many old Japanese poems.

References

External links
 
 

rubra
Endemic flora of China
Flora of South-Central China
Garden plants of Asia
Ornamental trees
Dioecious plants